Umesh Maskey is a Nepalese boxer. He competed in the men's light welterweight event at the 1984 Summer Olympics.

References

Year of birth missing (living people)
Living people
Nepalese male boxers
Olympic boxers of Nepal
Boxers at the 1984 Summer Olympics
Sportspeople from Kathmandu
Light-welterweight boxers
Boxers at the 1982 Asian Games
20th-century Nepalese people